Carex brainerdii, or Brainerd's sedge, is a species of sedge that was first described by Kenneth Mackenzie in 1913. It is native to California and Oregon.

References

brainerdii
Plants described in 1913